Double Hawk is a shoot 'em up video game for the Sega Master System. The basic premise of the game was that in the 1990s violence was spreading across the globe, brought forth by a group of terrorists. The protagonists, John Jackson and Jack Thomas, are sent into battle to eradicate all threats. Double Hawk has been called Sega's version of Cabal (which was ported to the rival Nintendo Entertainment System the same year).

Gameplay
The game consists of five missions, each with four levels ending in a boss fight. Throughout the game the player must eliminate various enemies including foot soldiers, armed vehicles, and helicopters using multiple guns and ordnance weapons. The player must survive the first 3 stages of every mission within a time limit, and while the 4th "boss" fight of every mission is also timed, that mission will not end until all enemy units have been eliminated.

A unique element that features in this game is that in co-op gameplay, players that gets hit 3 times and dies  will automatically re-spawn and take a hit off their co-op partner, provided their partner is not down to their last hit.

Various upgrades can be found in each level to facilitate game play. These upgrades would be in the form of colored boxes that fall from enemies that have been taken down. They include:
 Red [S] - Shooting - for a limited time, the player has a larger target range and faster shooting upgrades, which is useful for taking down air-based attacks from helicopters and planes
 Navy [R] - Rapid Fire - for a limited time, the player has the rapid fire ability with his gun, which is useful for taking down ground-based attacks from tanks and heavy machinery.
 Light blue [B] - Bombs - the player receives 10 hand bombs (grenades) to use on the enemy. The player is limited to carry a maximum of 99 grenades.
 Brown [F] - Faster - for the duration of the rest of that particular stage, the player is able to move around and aim his gun faster, useful for dodging bullets.

None of these upgrades remain with the player if he or she continues from a gameover.

References

External links

1990 video games
Europe-exclusive video games
Sega video games
Master System games
Master System-only games
Video games developed in Japan